The Ambassador of Canada to Syria is Canada's foremost diplomatic representative in Syria, and in charge of Canada's diplomatic mission in the Syria Arab Republic.

List of heads of mission
1965–1967: John Ryerson Maybee
1967–1969: Christian Hardy
1970–1974: Jacques Gilles Bruno Gignac
1974–1976: Léopold Henri Amyot
1976: Alan William Sullivan
1977–1978: Joseph Gilles André Couvrette
1978–1982: Théodore Jean Arcand
1982–1984: Robert David Jackson
1984–1985: Keith William MacLellan
1987–1990: Gary Richard Harman
1990–1993: David Martin Collacott
1993–1997: John McNee
1997–2000: Alexandra Bugailiskis
2000–2003: Franco Pillarella
2003–2006: Brian Davis
2006–2008: Mark Bailey
2008–2011: Glenn Davidson
2011–present: vacant
 http://www.international.gc.ca/media/aff/news-communiques/2011/229.aspx

References

Syria
Canadian ambassadors